Theobroma is a municipality located in the Brazilian state of Rondônia. Its population was 10,395 (2020) and its area is 2,197 km².

It is named after the plant genus Theobroma, which includes the economically significant Theobroma cacao.

References

Municipalities in Rondônia